This is a list of foreign players in the Scottish Premier League (1997-2013) or Scottish Premiership. The following players must meet both of the following two criteria:
Have played at least one Scottish Premier League game. Players who were signed by Scottish Premier League clubs, but only played in lower league, cup and/or European games, or did not play in any competitive games at all, are not included.
Are considered foreign, i.e., outside Great Britain and Ireland, determined by the following:
A player is considered foreign if he is not eligible to play for the national teams of Scotland, England, Wales, Northern Ireland or the Republic of Ireland.



Albania
Rudi Vata – Celtic – 1993–96
 Ylber Ramadani - Aberdeen - 2022 - Current

Algeria

Angola
José Quitongo – Heart of Midlothian, 1998-2000, Kilmarnock – 2002–03

Antigua and Barbuda
Zaine Francis-Angol – Motherwell – 2012–13

Argentina

Australia

Austria

Belgium

Logan Bailly - Celtic

Benin
Laurent D'Jaffo – Aberdeen – 2002–03

Bosnia and Herzegovina
Mirsad Bešlija – Heart of Midlothian – 2005–07
Saša Papac – Rangers – 2006–12
Dubravko Tešević – Livingston – 2005–06

Brazil

Bulgaria
Ilian Kiriakov – Aberdeen – 1998–2000
Tsanko Tsvetanov – Aberdeen – 1996–1998
Stiliyan Petrov – Celtic – 1999–2006
Aleksandar Tonev – Celtic – 2014–2015

Cameroon

Canada

Central African Republic
Ange Oueifio – Motherwell – 2000–01
Willi Oueifio – Heart of Midlothian – 2002–03

Chile
Mauricio Pinilla – Heart of Midlothian – 2006–08
Sebastián Rozental – Rangers 1998–2001

China PR
Fan Zhiyi – Dundee – 2001–02
Du Wei – Celtic – 2005–06
Zheng Zhi – Celtic – 2009–10

Colombia
David González Giraldo – Aberdeen 2011–12
Alfredo Morelos - Rangers 2017-

Congo
David Louhoungou – Hamilton Academical – 2009

Congo DR
Yves Ma-Kalambay – Hibernian – 2007–10
Michel Ngonge – Kilmarnock – 2001–02
Calvin Zola – Aberdeen – 2013–2014

Côte d'Ivoire

Croatia
Nikica Jelavic – Rangers – 2010–12
Dado Pršo – Rangers – 2004–07

Cyprus
Angelis Charalambous – Motherwell – 2010–11

Czech Republic

Denmark

Ecuador
Ulises de la Cruz – Hibernian – 2001–02
Eduardo Hurtado – Hibernian – 2001–02

Estonia
Henri Anier – Motherwell – 2013–2014 Dundee United – 2014–2016
Henrik Ojamaa – Motherwell – 2012–2013
Sander Puri – St Mirren – 2013

Faroe Islands
Jákup Mikkelsen – Partick Thistle – 2003–04
Gunnar Nielsen – Motherwell – 2013-15

Finland

France

Gabon
Willy Aubameyang – Kilmarnock – 2011–12
Daniel Cousin – Rangers – 2007–09

The Gambia
Pa Saikou Kujabi – Hibernian – 2012–13

Georgia
Shota Arveladze – Rangers – 2001–05
Temuri Ketsbaia – Dundee – 2001–02
Zurab Khizanishvili – Dundee, Rangers – 2000–05
Georgi Nemsadze – Dundee – 2000–04

Germany

Ghana

Greece

Giorgos Giakoumakis - Celtic F.C. - 2021-Present

Guinea
Bobo Baldé – Celtic – 2001–09
Mohammed Camara – Celtic, St Mirren – 2005–06, 2009–2010
Mohammed Sylla – St Johnstone, Celtic, Kilmarnock – 2000–05, 2006–07

Guinea-Bissau
Amido Baldé – Celtic – 2013–2014
Esmaël Gonçalves – St Mirren – 2013

Haiti
Lecsinel Jean-François – Falkirk – 2005–07
Abel Thermeus – Motherwell – 2006

Honduras
Jorge Claros – Hibernian – 2012–13
Emilio Izaguirre – Celtic – 2010–13
Francisco Ramírez – Dundee United – 2000–01

Hungary

Iceland

Iran
Alex Samizadeh – Kilmarnock – 2017–18

Israel

Celtic) 
Nir Bitton– Celtic – 2013–

Italy

Jamaica

Japan
Kyogo Furuhashi - Celtic F.C. - 2021-present
Koki Mizuno – Celtic – 2008–10
Shunsuke Nakamura – Celtic – 2005–09

Kenya
Victor Wanyama – Celtic – 2011–2013

Latvia
Vitālijs Maksimenko – Kilmarnock – 2014
Pavels Mihadjuks – Inverness CT – 2008–09

Liberia
Christopher Wreh – St Mirren – 2001–02

Lithuania

Madagascar
William Gros – Kilmarnock – 2010–2014

Mali
Amadou Konte – Hibernian – 2004–07
Mohamadou Sissoko – Kilmarnock – 2010–2011

Mexico
Efrain Juárez – Celtic – 2010–2012

Montenegro
Nikola Vujadinović – Aberdeen – 2010–2011

Montserrat
Junior Mendes – Dunfermline Athletic –  2000–02

Morocco

Namibia
Eliphas Shivute – Motherwell – 1998–99
Quinton Jacobs – Partick Thistle – 1999–2000

Netherlands

Netherlands Antilles
Dyron Daal – Aberdeen – 2006–07
Shelton Martis – Hibernian – 2006–07

New Zealand
Rory Fallon – Aberdeen, St Johnstone – 2011–13
Chris Killen – Hibernian, Celtic – 2005–10
Michael McGlinchey – Celtic, Motherwell – 2005–06, 2010
Steven Old – Kilmarnock – 2009–11

Nigeria

Norway

North Macedonia
Bajram Fetai – Rangers, Inverness CT – 2003–05
Ǵorǵi Hristov – Dunfermline Athletic – 2004–05
Goran Stanić – Livingston – 2004–05

Peru
José Valeriani – Dundee United – 1998–99

Poland

Portugal

Romania
Dorin Goian – Rangers – 2011–12
Marius Niculae – Inverness CT – 2007–08

Russia
Andrei Kanchelskis – Rangers – 1998–2002
Dmitri Kharine – Celtic – 1999–2002

Saint Lucia
Earl Jean – Hibernian – 1999–2000

Senegal

Serbia
Saša Ćurčić – Motherwell – 1999–2000
Dragan Mladenović – Rangers – 2004–05
Gordan Petrić – Rangers, Heart of Midlothian – 1998–99, 1999–2001

Sierra Leone
Mohamed Bangura – Celtic – 2011–2013

Slovakia

Slovenia
Danijel Marčeta – Falkirk – 2009–2010
Leon Panikvar – Kilmarnock – 2011–12
Jure Travner – St Mirren – 2010–2011

South Africa
Dean Furman – Rangers – 2007–08
Chad Harpur – Kilmarnock – 2007–08

South Korea
Cha Du-Ri – Celtic – 2010–2012
Ki Sung-Yueng – Celtic – 2010–12

Spain

Sweden

Switzerland
Stéphane Henchoz – Celtic – 2004–05
Oumar Kondé – Hibernian – 2006–07
Mihael Kovačević – Dundee United, Ross County – 2008–11, 2012–13
Ramon Vega – Celtic – 2000–01

Togo
Yoann Folly – Aberdeen – 2010–12
Mamam Cherif Touré – Livingston – 2001–04

Trinidad and Tobago

Tunisia
Hamed Namouchi – Rangers – 2003–06
Lassad Nouioui – Celtic – 2012–13

Turkey
Tugay Kerimoğlu – Rangers – 1999–2001

Uganda
David Obua – Heart of Midlothian – 2008–12

United States
 
DaMarcus Beasley – Rangers – 2007–10
Alejandro Bedoya – Rangers – 2011–12
Carlos Bocanegra – Rangers – 2011–12
Dominic Cervi – Celtic – 2008–12
Maurice Edu – Rangers – 2008–12
Claudio Reyna – Rangers – 1998–02

Uruguay
Carlos Marcora – Dundee United – 2000–01
Gerardo Traverso – Dundee – 2001–02
Fabián Yantorno – Gretna, Hibernian – 2007–09

Venezuela
Jonay Hernandez – Dundee – 2002–04
Fernando de Ornelas – Celtic – 1999–2000
Miku – Celtic – 2012–13

Notes

References 

 
Scottish Premier League
Foreign players
Association football player non-biographical articles